The 2023 elections in India are expected to include those to the Rajya Sabha, to state legislative assemblies of nine states and one union terrritory, and local bodies.Out of 9 in 3 states elections were held as of March 2023.

Lok Sabha by-elections

Rajya Sabha
Main Article:- Rajya sabha election 2023

State legislative assembly elections 

 Tentative schedule as per assembly tenure  Speculated

Legislative Assembly by-elections

Arunachal Pradesh

Jharkhand

Kerala

Maharashtra

Meghalaya

Odisha

Rajasthan

Tamil Nadu

Telangana

Tripura

Uttar Pradesh

West Bengal

Local body elections

Haryana

Himachal Pradesh

Karnataka

Maharashtra

Manipur

Punjab

Uttar Pradesh

Uttarakhand

West Bengal

See also
 2024 elections in India
 2022 elections in India
 2023 Rajya Sabha elections

References

External links
Election Commission of India (official website)

 
Elections in India by year
2023 in India
2023 elections in Asia